Welgelegen may refer to

Places
Welgelegen, Cape Town, South Africa
Welgelegen, Paramaribo District, a resort in Suriname
Welgelegen, Coronie District, a resort in Suriname

Windmills
Welgelegen, Heerenveen, Friesland
Welgelegen, Veendam, Groningen

Other meanings
Villa Welgelegen, Haarlem, Netherlands.